NA-63 Gujrat-II is a constituency for the National Assembly of Pakistan which includes Jalalpur Jattan.

Members of Parliament

2018-2022: NA-68 Gujrat-I

Election 2002 

General elections were held on 10 Oct 2002. Chaudhry Wajahat Hussain of PML-Q won by 82,126 votes.

Election 2008 

General elections were held on 18 Feb 2008. Chaudhry Wajahat Hussain of PML-Q won by 96,379 votes.

Election 2013 

General elections were held on 11 May 2013. Nawabzada Mazher Ali, brother of Nawabzada Gazanfar Ali Gul of PPP contested under the ticket of PML-N and won the seat by 85,113 votes and became the  member of National Assembly.

Election 2018 
General elections were held on 25 July 2018.

See also
NA-62 Gujrat-I
NA-64 Gujrat-III

References

External links 
Election result's official website
Delimitation 2018 official website Election Commission of Pakistan

68
68